Gauruncus venezolanus is a species of moth of the family Tortricidae. It is found in Venezuela.

Etymology
The species name refers to the country of Venezuela.

References

Moths described in 2004
Euliini
Moths of South America
Taxa named by Józef Razowski